The Daily Malta Chronicle and Garrison Gazette was an English-language daily newspaper in Malta, first issued on 14 November 1884, and running till June 1940.

History
Originally a weekly newspaper intended as a general paper for British servicemen stationed in Malta, it later began to be issued daily. It took on a political stance after 1901, when it began to publish pro-British and imperialist contributions by Gerald Strickland.

Its issue no. 1510, published on 26 June 1897 and price three pence, was printed on silk, commemorating the Diamond Jubilee of Queen Victoria and reporting a day-by-day account of the local celebratory events, extending from Saturday to Tuesday, 19 to 22 June.

See also

Times of Malta

References

Defunct newspapers published in Malta
Publications established in 1884
1884 establishments in Malta